Beyond Rejection is a novel by Justin Leiber published in 1980.

Plot summary
Beyond Rejection is a novel in which Ismael Forth suffers a fatal accident and has his mind transferred into the body of Sally Cadmus.

Reception
Greg Costikyan reviewed Beyond Rejection in Ares Magazine #6 and commented that "On one level [...] Beyond Rejection is a fast-paced thriller; on another, it is a psychological novel detailing Forth's gradual acceptance of his new body; on still another, it is a superbly written and thoroughly civilized book."

Reviews
Review by Tom Easton (1981) in Analog Science Fiction/Science Fact, April 27, 1981

References

1980 American novels